Calandrinus is a genus of flower weevils in the beetle family Curculionidae. There are at least four described species in Calandrinus.

Species
These four species belong to the genus Calandrinus:
 Calandrinus angustulus Casey, 1920
 Calandrinus grandicollis LeConte, 1876
 Calandrinus insignis Casey & T.L., 1892
 Calandrinus obsoletus Casey, 1892

References

Further reading

 
 
 

Baridinae
Articles created by Qbugbot